Spreng may refer to:

30 cm Wurfkörper 42 Spreng, a rocket
Sebastian Spreng (born 1956), Argentine-born American visual artist and music journalist
Liselotte Spreng (1912–1992), Swiss women's rights activist
Spreng., taxonomic author abbreviation of Kurt Polycarp Joachim Sprengel (1766–1833), German botanist and physician